Eswort Lorenzo Brian Coombs (born 26 November 1972) is a retired track and field sprinter from Saint Vincent and the Grenadines who specialized in the 400 metres.

In addition to 400 m he holds the national record in 4 x 400 metres relay with 3:06.52 minutes, achieved with teammates Thomas Dickson, Eversley Linley, Erasto Sampson during the heats at the 1996 Summer Olympics.

Achievements

References

1972 births
Living people
Saint Vincent and the Grenadines male sprinters
Athletes (track and field) at the 1992 Summer Olympics
Athletes (track and field) at the 1996 Summer Olympics
Olympic athletes of Saint Vincent and the Grenadines
Athletes (track and field) at the 1994 Commonwealth Games
Athletes (track and field) at the 1991 Pan American Games
Athletes (track and field) at the 1995 Pan American Games
Pan American Games bronze medalists for Saint Vincent and the Grenadines
Pan American Games medalists in athletics (track and field)
Commonwealth Games competitors for Saint Vincent and the Grenadines
Universiade medalists in athletics (track and field)
Universiade medalists for Saint Vincent and the Grenadines
Medalists at the 1995 Summer Universiade
Medalists at the 1995 Pan American Games